Andre Soriano (born September 17, 1970) is an American fashion designer, specializing in couture and wedding gowns. He is also a reality television star and a supporter of former United States president Donald Trump.

Early life 
Soriano was born and raised to a Filipino family in Manila, Philippines.

Television 
In 2013, he competed on the first season of Styled to Rock and came in 7th place.

Fashion 
Andre Soriano's first runway show was at San Diego Fashion Week. In 2014, Soriano was featured at Style Fashion Week L.A. officially knows as Los Angeles Fashion Week, showcasing his a pre-fall collection. His models included celebrities such as Jessica Sanchez and María Conchita Alonso. He was praised for his Heiress collection at Style Fashion Week.

Sorian's swimwear line has been worn by Maitland Ward. He is also well known for his luxury bridal wear. Soriano designed a dress for singer Joy Villa for the 2015 Grammy Awards made entirely of orange construction fencing that attracted media attention. He was also featured in Vanity Fair for a gown he made for Christianne Christensen.

Politics
Soriano has openly spoken about LGBT issues. Being a supporter of United States president Donald Trump, he designed a gown for Joy Villa for the 2017 Grammy Awards in support of Donald Trump's 2016 presidential campaign.

In 2020, Soriano again created a dress worn by Villa supporting Donald Trump's 2020 presidential campaign.

References

External links
 

1970 births
American fashion designers
American fashion businesspeople
American LGBT businesspeople
LGBT fashion designers
Living people
LGBT people from California
People from San Diego
Participants in American reality television series
Filipino fashion designers
People from Manila
California Republicans
21st-century LGBT people